Sofia Hvenfelt (born 23 April 1996) is a Swedish handball player who plays for København Håndbold and the Swedish national team.

She made her debut on the Swedish national team on 21 March 2018.

Achievements 
Elitserien:
Winner: 2017
Silver Medalist: 2018
EHF Challenge Cup:
Finalist: 2017

Individuel awards 
All-Star Line player of the European Junior Championship: 2015

References

1996 births
Living people
Swedish female handball players
Handball players from Gothenburg
Handball players at the 2014 Summer Youth Olympics
21st-century Swedish women